Sədəfli is a village and municipality in the Gobustan Rayon of Azerbaijan. It has a population of 300.

References

Populated places in Gobustan District